Nebria uluderensis is a species of ground beetle from Nebriinae subfamily that is endemic to Turkey.

References

uluderensis
Beetles described in 1984
Beetles of Asia
Endemic fauna of Turkey